"Congratulations" is a song recorded by British singer Cliff Richard. The song was written by Bill Martin and Phil Coulter. It is best known as the British entry at the Eurovision Song Contest 1968, held in London finishing in second place behind the Spanish entry. The song went on to reach number 1 in many countries including Spain.

Background
The song was arranged, conducted and produced by Norrie Paramor who was also musical director for the contest, which was held at London's Royal Albert Hall.

Phil Coulter originally wrote the song as "I Think I Love You", but was unsure of the lyrics and got together with Bill Martin (the same team that wrote "Puppet on a String"), who changed it to "Congratulations".

The song was immediately popular in the UK and became a number one single. On the day of the contest, it was the favourite to win, so much so that the British press were posing the question: "What will come second to 'Congratulations'?".

During the voting, "Congratulations" was leading for much of the way until the penultimate vote when Germany gave Spain six points, putting them one point ahead of the United Kingdom. It finished second losing to 's entry "La, la, la" by just one point. However, "Congratulations" went on to become a huge hit throughout Europe.

In 2008, documentary film-maker Montse Fernandez Vila claimed that the loss was the result of rigging of the Spanish vote by state television on behalf of the Francoist State. However José María Íñigo, the person that made such claims in the documentary, quickly said that his words were taken out of context and said that the channel that produced the documentary, laSexta, who was the promoter of the Spanish representative that year, Rodolfo Chikilicuatre, had manipulated his words to help promote their candidate. He said: "if there had been such a manipulation, it would have been for a different artist who had been closer to the regime".

In July 1968, the song was included on the six-track Columbia EP Congratulations: Cliff Sings 6 Songs for Europe.

The song is still popular and was chosen to lead the show which celebrated 50 years of Eurovision and which was named after it: Congratulations: 50 Years of the Eurovision Song Contest. Richard also performed the song as part of the commemorations for the 50th anniversary of VE Day in 1995, despite it having been written long after the end of World War II.

George Harrison's song "It's Johnny's Birthday" from his 1970 album All Things Must Pass is based on this song. The writers Martin and Coulter filed a claim in December 1970 against Harrison for royalties, and subsequent pressings of the album credit their contribution.

Chart performance

See also
 Congratulations: 50 Years of the Eurovision Song Contest

References

Cliff Richard songs
Pinky and Perky songs
Eurovision songs of 1968
Eurovision songs of the United Kingdom
Congratulations Eurovision songs
UK Singles Chart number-one singles
Number-one singles in Norway
Irish Singles Chart number-one singles
1968 singles
Songs written by Bill Martin (songwriter)
Songs written by Phil Coulter
1968 songs
Schlager songs
Columbia Graphophone Company singles
Song recordings produced by Norrie Paramor